Prays is a genus of moths of the family Praydidae, formerly assigned to (depending on the author) Plutellidae or Yponomeutidae.

Selected species

Prays acmonias - Meyrick, 1914 (from India)
Prays alpha - Moriuti, 1977 (from Japan)
Prays amblystola - Turner, 1923  (from Australia)
Prays armynoti Bippus, 2020 (from Réunion)
Prays atomocella - (Dyar, 1902) (from Texas)
Prays autocasis - Meyrick, 1907  (from Australia)
Prays beta - Moriuti, 1977 (Japan, Russia, South Korea)
Prays caenobitella - Hübner, 1816 
Prays calycias - Meyrick, 1907  (from Queensland)
Prays chrysophyllae - Silvestri, 1915  (from Eritrea)
Prays cingulata - H.L. Yu & H.H. Li, 2004 (from China)
Prays citri - Milliére, 1873  (worldwide distribution)
Prays curalis - Meyrick, 1914  (from India)
Prays delta - Moriuti, 1977 (from China, South Korea, Japan)
Prays ducalis - Meyrick,  (from Sri Lanka)
Prays endocarpa - Meyrick, 1919  (Indonesia/Malaysia)
Prays endolemma - Diakonoff, 1967  (from the Philippines)
Prays epsilon - Moriuti, 1977 (from Japan)
Prays erebitis - Meyrick,  (from India, Oriental)
Prays fraxinella - Bjerkander, 1784  (from Europe)
Prays friesei - Klimesch, 1992  (from Canary islands)
Prays fulvocanella - Walsingham, 1907 
Prays galapagosella - B. Landry & J.F. Landry, 1998 (Galapagos islands)
Prays gamma - Moriuti, 1977 (from Japan)
Prays ignota - J.F.G.Clarke, 1986 (from Polynesia)
Prays inconspicua - H.L. Yu & H.H. Li, 2004 (from China)
Prays inscripta - Meyrick, 1907  (from Australia)
Prays iota - Moriuti, 1977 (from Japan)
Prays kappa - Moriuti, 1977 (from Japan)
Prays kalligraphos - J.C. Sohn & C.S. Wu, 2011 (from China)
Prays lambda - Moriuti, 1977 (from Japan)
Prays liophaea - Meyrick, 1927 
Prays lobata - H.L. Yu & H.H. Li, 2004 (from China)
Prays nephelomima - Meyrick, 1907 
Prays oleae - Bernard, 1788  (from Europe)
Prays oleaceoides Gibeaux, 1985 (from Madagascar)
Prays oliviella - Boyer, 1837 
Prays omicron - Moriuti, 1977 (from Japan)
Prays parilis - Turner, 1923  (from Australia)
Prays peperitis - Meyrick, 1907  (from Sri Lanka)
Prays peregrina - Agassiz, 2007 (from England)
Prays ruficeps - Heinemann, 1854  (from Europe)
Prays sparsipunctella - Turati, 1924  (from Libya)
Prays stratella - Zeller, 1877 
Prays sublevatella - Viette, 1957  (from Réunion)
Prays temulenta - Meyrick, 1910  (from Himalaya)
Prays tineiformis - J.C. Sohn & C.S. Wu, 2011 (from China)
Prays tyrastis - Meyrick, 1907  (from Australia)
Prays xeroloxa - Meyrick, 1935  (from Java/Indonesia)

References

 , 2007: Prays peregrina sp. n. (Yponomeutidae) a presumed adventive species in Greater London. Nota Lepidopterologica 30 (2): 407—410. Full article: .
 , 1998: Yponomeutidae of the Galapagos Islands, with description of a new species of Prays (Lepidoptera: Yponomeutoidea). Tropical Lepidoptera Research 9 (1): 31-40.Full article: 
 , 2011, A taxonomic review of Prays Hübner, 1825 (Lepidoptera: Yponomeutoidea: Praydidae) China with descriptions of two new species. Tijdschrift voor Entomologie 154 (1): 25-32.

Moth genera
Plutellidae
Taxa named by Jacob Hübner